Soninke may refer to:
 Soninke people
 Soninke language

Language and nationality disambiguation pages